HMS Orion was a 74-gun third rate ship of the line of the British Royal Navy, launched at Deptford on 1 June 1787 to the design of the , by William Bately. She took part in all the major actions of the French Revolutionary and Napoleonic Wars under a series of distinguished captains.

In 1794 she fought at the Glorious First of June under Captain John Thomas Duckworth.

Orion was at Plymouth on 20 January 1795 and so shared in the proceeds of the detention of the Dutch naval vessels, East Indiamen, and other merchant vessels that were in port on the outbreak of war between Britain and the Netherlands.

Later in 1795, Captain James Saumarez was appointed in command. Under Saumarez, Orion took part in the defeat of the French fleet at the Battle of Groix off Lorient on 22 June.

In October 1795 Orion recaptured the merchantman , Atterbury, master, which had been among a number o vessels that a French frigate squadron had captured in late September.

Nancy Perriam, one of the very few women to serve on a Royal Navy ship during the Coalition Wars, served on the Orion under Saumarez during this period.

In early 1797 Orion joined the Mediterranean Fleet and distinguished herself at the Battle of Cape St. Vincent on 14 February. She then took part in the blockade of Cadiz from March 1797 to April 1798, when she was sent into the Mediterranean as part of a small squadron under the command of Rear-Admiral Horatio Nelson. In August, Nelson finally caught up with the French fleet, resulting in the Battle of the Nile, where Captain Saumarez was wounded.
 

After Trafalgar, Orion continued in the blockade of Cadiz. On 25 November,  detained the Ragusan ship Nemesis, which was sailing from Isle de France to Leghorn, Italy, with a cargo of spice, indigo dye, and other goods. Orion shared the prize money with ten other British warships.

Fate
Orion was broken up in 1814.

In popular culture
In the Patrick O'Brian novel Post Captain, Capt. Jack Aubrey says he was third lieutenant aboard HMS Orion at the Battle of Cape St. Vincent.

Citations

References

Will of henry Plowman Surgeon's First Mate 15 Jan 1802
Lavery, Brian (2003) The Ship of the Line - Volume 1: The development of the battlefleet 1650-1850. Conway Maritime Press. .

Ships of the line of the Royal Navy
Canada-class ships of the line
Ships built in Deptford
1787 ships